The Vinești is a right tributary of the river Mureș in Romania. It discharges into the Mureș in Săvârșin. Its Hungarian name means “Customs Creek”.

References

Rivers of Romania
Rivers of Arad County